Grand Isle State Park is a 226-acre state park in Grand Isle, Vermont on the shore of Lake Champlain.

Activities includes boating, swimming, camping, fishing, hiking, picnicking, bicycling, wildlife watching, water sports and winter sports.

Facilities include a boat launching ramp, sand-court volleyball, horseshoes, a play area, 117 tent/RV sites, 36 lean-to sites, 4 cabin sites, restrooms with running water and hot showers, and a trailer sanitary station.

The park features a nature center and park rangers offer interpretive programs including night hikes, campfire programs, amphibian explorations, and nature crafts and games.

References

State parks of Vermont
Protected areas of Grand Isle County, Vermont
Grand Isle, Vermont
Nature centers in Vermont
Lake Champlain
1959 establishments in Vermont